"Du" ("You") is a song by German musician Peter Maffay from his 1970 album Für das Mädchen, das ich liebe. It was his debut single as a solo artist.

The song was covered in 1986 by Dutch singer Andre Hazes as the title-track for his album Jij Bent Alles. David Hasselhoff also covered the song in 1994, but failed to eclipse the success of both Maffay's (Germany #43, Switzerland #41) and his own hit "Looking for Freedom" (#1 in Germany and Switzerland). Both songs are on the album Looking for... the Best.

A video clip from David Hasselhoff's cover was shown for comedic effect in the 2004 comedy, Eurotrip.

Peter Maffay song You spend two full weeks on the South African music charts in the #1 position.

Track listing 

 German 7" single

 "Du" – 5:00
 "Jeder Junge braucht ein Mädchen" – 2:35

Charts

See also 

 List of number-one hits of 1970 (Germany)

References

External links 

 

1970 songs
1970 debut singles
Peter Maffay songs
David Hasselhoff songs
Number-one singles in Germany
Rock ballads
1970s ballads
German-language songs